is a Japanese manga series written and illustrated by Yama Wayama. The series follows a yakuza lieutenant who seeks instruction in karaoke from the head of a high school choir. A one-shot (single chapter) sequel,  was published in the November 2020 issue of the manga magazine Comic Beam. A live-action film adaptation is set to premiere in 2023.

Synopsis
Satomi Oka, the third-year head of a high school choir, is in preparations for his final performance before graduating. After seeing him perform, yakuza lieutenant Kyouji Narita asks Satomi to coach him in singing in advance of an annual karaoke competition held by his boss.

Development and release
Series creator Yama Wayama originally approached the manga magazine Morning to write a manga series about the yakuza, though the editors of the magazine declined her pitch. Having previously authored  (self-published manga), Wayama elected to instead publish the story in this format. She originally conceived of the story as one where a yakuza becomes a school teacher, but decided to instead make a story about a "bromance" between two characters with a significant age difference, ultimately settlling on the final concept of the story.

The  was originally sold at the 129th edition of the  convention  on August 25, 2019. It sold out at the event and was re-released several times via mail order, but nevertheless sold out frequently and became difficult to obtain. Kadokawa Future Publishing acquired the series to publish as a collected edition, which was released on September 12, 2020. The collected edition contains a newly illustrated chapter depicting Kyouji's past, as well as general additions and corrections to the art and dialogue. An English-language translation of the Kadokawa edition was published by Yen Press on May 24, 2022.

A one-shot sequel, Let's Go to the Family Restaurant, was published in the December 2020 issue of Kadokawa's manga magazine Comic Beam on November 12, 2020. The one-shot depicts Satomi as a freshman in college. The bonus chapter from the Kadokawa edition was re-published in the May 2021 issue of Comic Beam, published on April 12, 2021.

Adaptations
A live reading of Let's Go Karaoke! was performed at Tokorozawa Sakura Town in Tokorozawa, Saitama on December 19, 2021. The performance starred Taichi Ichikawa as Satomi, Takuya Eguchi as Kyouji, and Kenta Miyake as Kyouji's boss. A Let's Go Karaoke-themed pop-up cafe was hosted at the EJ Anime Theater in Shinjuku, Tokyo from December 4 to 26, 2021, to promote the live reading.

The film will star Jun Saitō as Satomi and Go Ayano as Kyouji.

Reception
500,000 copies of Let's Go Karaoke! are in print as of October 2022.

References

External links
 

2019 manga
Comedy anime and manga
Comics set in Tokyo
Doujinshi
Enterbrain manga
Manga adapted into films
Self-published books
Seinen manga
Yakuza in anime and manga
Yen Press titles
Japanese comedy films